The Tenth Sub Level of Suicide is the debut studio album by American black metal musical act Leviathan. It was recorded entirely on a Tascam four-track tape recorder in mainman Wrest's home, and was released September 29, 2003 by Seattle, Washington-based underground record label Moribund Cult.

Concept
"It's about different phases/levels of contemplation towards an action. The act of self-extermination", says Wrest. "All the lyrics, for the exception of [track] two, are about suicide, in one form or another."

Track listing

References

2003 debut albums
Concept albums
Leviathan (musical project) albums